Tanjong Public Limited Company is a Malaysian power generation, entertainment, and real estate conglomerate. It was founded as Tanjong Tin Dredging Ltd on 2 January 1926 in England. The company subsequently changed its name to Tanjong PLC in 1991, following a corporate restructure. Tanjong shares were formerly listed on the Bursa Malaysia and London Stock Exchange.

The company's principal activities include the operation of Pan Malaysian Pools Sdn Bhd, a Malaysian lottery business. They have diversified into power generation plants, property investment, and liquefied petroleum gas distribution.

Power generation
Through its subsidiary, Tanjong PLC owns and operates 13 power generation plants located throughout Middle East, North Africa, South Asia and Asia.

Subsidiaries
 TGV Cinemas
 Tropical Islands Resort
 Impian Klasik Sdn. Bhd (67%)

References

External links
 
 Company Overview of Tanjong Public Limited Company, bloomberg.com
 Tanjong Public Limited Company (MYX: 2267), bursamalaysia.com

Companies formerly listed on the London Stock Exchange
Electric power companies of Malaysia
Gambling companies of Malaysia
Companies formerly listed on Bursa Malaysia
Conglomerate companies established in 1926
1926 establishments in England
Privately held companies of Malaysia